The seventh season of Supernatural, an American dark fantasy television series created by Eric Kripke, premiered September 23, 2011, and concluded May 18, 2012, airing 23 episodes. The season focuses on protagonists Sam (Jared Padalecki) and Dean Winchester (Jensen Ackles) facing a new enemy called Leviathans, stronger than anything they have encountered so far as well as rendering their usual weapons useless. 

On January 12, 2012, the season won two People's Choice Awards including Best Network TV Drama. This is the second and final season of Sera Gamble as showrunner, with Jeremy Carver taking over the role for season eight. Warner Home Video released the season on DVD and Blu-ray in Region 1 on September 18, 2012, in region 2 on November 5, 2012, and in Region 4 on October 31, 2012. The seventh season had an average viewership of 1.73 million U.S. viewers.

Cast

Starring
 Jared Padalecki as Sam Winchester
 Jensen Ackles as Dean Winchester

Special guest stars
 Misha Collins as Castiel / Emanuel
 James Marsters as Don Stark
 Charisma Carpenter as Maggie Stark
 DJ Qualls as Garth Fitzgerald IV

Guest stars

Episodes

In this table, the number in the first column refers to the episode's number within the entire series, whereas the number in the second column indicates the episode's number within this particular season. "U.S. viewers in millions" refers to how many Americans watched the episode live or on the day of broadcast.

Production 
The series was renewed for a seventh season on April 26, 2011, and remained on Fridays at 9:00 pm (ET). 

The CW announced on August 20, 2011, that the season would be increased to 23 episodes, up one episode from the 22-episode pickup the series had previously received. 

On January 11, 2012, it was announced by the executive producer of the show, Robert Singer, that there was another cliffhanger ending planned for season seven.

Reception
Critical reception to the season was generally positive. The review aggregator website Rotten Tomatoes reported a 100% approval rating with an average rating of 8.83/10 based on 5 reviews. One criticism from reviewers was of the lack of an emotional link between the Leviathans as a whole and the Winchester brothers, an element which had been present in previous seasons. The lack of threat from the monsters was also noted as a downside to the season, though the portrayal of James Patrick Stuart as Dick Roman, using corporate mannerisms and charm mixed with his own self-confidence, was pointed to as a high point of the story arc.

The overturn of Mark Sheppard's character Crowley at the final moments of the season, was very surprising for the critics. Many argued that Crowley's successful separation of the Winchester brothers by taking advantage of Dean's imprisonment in Purgatory and the kidnap of both Kevin and Meg was a good cliffhanger going into the next season, and that it opened up many possibilities and questions. Another well-received point was the return of the Impala at the end of season, much to the appreciation of the fans, and Misha Collins' portrayal of the resurrected and traumatized Castiel, which brought a new element to the chemistry between the brothers.

References

External links 

Supernatural 07
2011 American television seasons
2012 American television seasons